Venezia Porto Marghera railway station is a stop located in the trunk railway between Venezia Mestre and Venezia Santa Lucia just before the bridge across the lagoon. It is located at 260.191 kilometer of the Milan-Venice railway and operated by Rete Ferroviaria Italiana. The train services are operated by Trenitalia and Sistemi Territoriali. The technology park "Vega" is in its immediate vicinity.

History 
The first station was opened in Venice Marghera at December 13, 1842 in the aftermath of the inauguration of Marghera – Padua, the first section of the strada ferrata Ferdinandea.

The location of the port was temporary, so that in January 1844, when the bridge over the lagoon had not still been completed it was moved to San Giuliano.

Features 
There are four tracks and four platforms, where the users can access by an underpass.

The stop has four pedestrian entrances:

 via Paganello side Mestre (near via Torino and via Ca 'Marcello);
 via Della Libertà, roadway Venice;
 via Della Libertà, roadway Mestre;
 the fourth access, by way of Liberty, roadway Mestre, actually located in Via Torino, being a pedestrian path delimited with double guardrails continue until the subway station.

Developments

Train services
The station is served by the following services:

Regional services (Treno regionale) Verona – Vicenza – Padua – Venice
Regional services (Treno regionale) Bassano del Grappa – Castelfranco Veneto – Venice
Local services (Treno regionale) Portogruaro – Venice
Local services (Treno regionale) Adria – Piove di Sacco – Venice

Services
The station has:
 Bus stops (via della Libertà, both carriageways)
 Underpass

Gallery

External links

Note

References
 

Railway stations in Veneto